Breeland is a surname. Notable people with the surname include:

 Bashaud Breeland (born 1992), American football player
 Floyd Breeland (1933–2020), American politician
 Jake Breeland (born 1997), American football player

See also
 Breland (disambiguation)